Robert Herman Wallath (1874–1960) was a notable New Zealand farmer, carpenter and highwayman. He was born at sea in 1874. He was the son of a respected family of German immigrants to New Plymouth. Wallath's crime spree went on for 15 months until he was overpowered when holding up a hotel. There was general astonishment when it was discovered who the perpetrator was. Wallath was sent to Mount Eden Prison in Auckland for eight years, but because of support from New Plymouth people, he was released after four and a half years in 1898. He returned to New Plymouth and married Ada Clara West in June 1901, with whom he had four children (one of whom was adopted), and they had an exemplary lifestyle and were respected members of the community. In 1959, Wallath wrote a book about his teenage struggle with good and evil, A highwayman with a mission under a pseudonym. He died on 24 July 1960, and was survived by his wife by two years.

Wallath Road in New Plymouth commemorates the Wallath family.

References

1874 births
1960 deaths
New Zealand farmers
New Zealand woodworkers
New Zealand criminals
Place of birth missing
Place of death missing
Highwaymen
People born at sea